The Copa Rubro–Verde, was a pré-season tournament which brought together the "Portuguesas" of Brazilian football. All the matches was played in Estádio do Canindé (2018, 2019) and Estádio Luso Brasileiro (2019).

Participants 

Note For the 2019 edition, the Portuguese team CS Marítimo was invited

List of Champions

References  

Associação Atlética Portuguesa (RJ)
Associação Portuguesa de Desportos
Recurring sporting events established in 2018
Recurring events disestablished in 2019
2018 in Brazilian football
2019 in Brazilian football
Defunct football competitions in Brazil